Bryan Cupito (born June 29, 1984) is a former American football player.  He was the starting quarterback for the Minnesota Golden Gophers for three years, from 2004 to 2006. He graduated from McNicholas High School in Cincinnati, Ohio in 2002 before graduating from the University of Minnesota in 2006.

Family
Many members of Cupito's family had ties to either college or professional-level sports. These include:
 Joe Cupito, Bryan's grandfather, who played for the Chicago Cubs
 Steve Cupito, Bryan's father, who played college football for the Louisville Cardinals
 Brad Cupito, Bryan's brother, who played college football for the Indiana Hoosiers

Bryan was the younger of his one other sibling, Brad Cupito. His parents are Steve Cupito and Erin Cupito, from Cincinnati, Ohio

College career
Cupito ranks second on Minnesota's career passing yards list, with 7,446. He also ranks second in Gophers history in touchdowns with 55.

See also
 List of Minnesota Golden Gophers football passing leaders

References

1984 births
Living people
American football quarterbacks
Minnesota Golden Gophers football players
Players of American football from Cincinnati